Sololo is a small town in Kenya's former Eastern Province, now part of Marsabit County. It is the 4th largest urban centre in Marsabit County with a population of 5,104.

Sololo is located on the Moyale-Sololo escarpment which has semi-arid climatic conditions. The town is connected with electricity from Ethiopia, which is only about 5 km away.

References 

Populated places in Marsabit County